Tajikistan State University of Law, Business, & Politics - TSULBP (Original: Донишгоҳи Давлатии Ҳуқуқ, Бизнес, ва Сиёсати Тоҷикистон - ДДҲБСТ) is one of several state-funded, five-year universities of higher education in the region of Sughd in Tajikistan. Located in Khujand, the school offers bachelor's and master's degrees as well as post-graduate education.

History
Tajikistan State University of Law, Business and Politics was established on August 5, 1993 by the initiative and support of the Supreme Council of the Republic of Tajikistan.

Campus setting
There are five buildings that are occupied by the university in different parts of the city. The main building of TSULBP is located on the 17th district of Khujand city. The university has its own library consisting of more than 350,000 books and a computer and internet equipped classroom.

Academic organization
TSULBP offers four-year bachelor's and five-year master's degrees as well as post graduate courses in the fields of law, economics, political science, philosophy, history, and mathematics. In addition, TSULBP offers part-time courses.

The university is composed of the following faculties (schools): 
Faculty of Law
Faculty of Business and management
Faculty of Accounting and Tax
Faculty of Finance
Faculty of Politics and International Relations
Faculty of Innovation and Telecommunications

Accreditation
TSULBP is accredited by the Ministry of Education of the Republic of Tajikistan.

External links
 Таджикский Государственный Университет Права, Бизнеса, и Политики (official website)

References

Universities in Tajikistan